Altica cyanea is a species of flea beetle. It is a pest of millets such as sorghum in India. It is being investigated as a biological pest control of Ludwigia adscendens, a common weed in rice fields.

References

Alticini
Insects of India
Beetles described in 1801
Biological pest control beetles